Repeat After Me is an American hidden camera television series on ABC based on one of the segments from The Ellen DeGeneres Show. The series premiered on February 17, 2015. The series is executive produced by talk show host Ellen DeGeneres.

Format
The series features host Wendi McLendon-Covey guiding celebrities via a remote ear piece to interact with everyday people who do not know they are being filmed. Each episode features different celebrities. The most memorable moment of the night is crowned in front of a live studio audience at the end of each episode.

Episodes

International versions

References

External links
 
 
 

2010s American reality television series
2015 American television series debuts
2015 American television series endings
American Broadcasting Company original programming
English-language television shows
American hidden camera television series
Television series by Warner Horizon Television
Television series by A Very Good Production